Guy Tyrone Prather (March 28, 1958 – April 18, 2016) was a linebacker in the National Football League. He played five seasons with the Green Bay Packers.

Prather died of cancer in 2016. He is buried in Gate of Heaven Cemetery in Aspen Hill, Maryland.

References

1958 births
2016 deaths
Burials at Gate of Heaven Cemetery (Silver Spring, Maryland)
People from Gaithersburg, Maryland
Green Bay Packers players
American football linebackers
Grambling State Tigers football players
Players of American football from Maryland
Gaithersburg High School alumni